Vista Hermosa (Spanish: "beautiful view") is a municipality in the Mexican state of Michoacán, located approximately  northwest of the state capital of Morelia.

Geography
It borders the Michoacanese municipalities of Tanhuato to the east, Ixtlán to the southeast, Pajacuarán to the southwest, and Briseñas to the west. Additionally, the Lerma River forms the border between Vista Hermosa and the Jaliscan municipality of La Barca to the north.

As of 2009, 91% of the land in Vista Hermosa is used for agriculture and urban areas cover another 4% of the municipality. Vertisols are the main soil type in the municipality. The  flows east to west through the southern part of the municipality, and meets the Lerma River at Ibarra in the adjacent municipality of Briseñas.

Vista Hermosa has a temperate climate with rain in the summer.

History
The settlement of Vista Hermosa was organized in the second half of the 19th century from the haciendas of Buenavista and El Molino. Vista Hermosa was established as a municipality on 1 December 1921 from localities previously part of Ixtlán and Tanhuato. The municipal seat was named Vista Hermosa de Negrete after José María Martínez Negrete, who bought the lands of the Molino hacienda after they were confiscated by the Mexican government and built a school there. In 1950, the municipality of Briseñas was separated from Vista Hermosa.

Administration
The municipal government of Vista Hermosa comprises a president, a councillor (Spanish: síndico), and seven trustees (regidores), four elected by relative majority and three by proportional representation. The current president of the municipality is Rosa Elena de la Cruz Pérez Tello.

Demographics
In the 2010 Mexican Census, the municipality of Vista Hermosa recorded a population of 18,995 inhabitants living in 4789 households. The 2015 Intercensal Survey estimated a population of 20,624 inhabitants in Vista Hermosa.

INEGI lists 16 localities in the municipality, of which two are classified as urban:

the municipal seat Vista Hermosa de Negrete, which recorded a population of 10,752 inhabitants in the 2010 Census; and

Economy and infrastructure
Agriculture is the main economic activity in Vista Hermosa. Major crops grown include corn, sorghum, wheat, and vegetables such as chiles. The largest employer in the municipality is the meat producer SuKarne, which maintains a herd of 150,000 cattle in the municipality.

The toll expressway Federal Highway 15D runs through the municipality, as do Federal Highways 35 and 110.

References

Municipalities of Michoacán
1921 establishments in Mexico
States and territories established in 1921